Charlotte Hovring (born 3 September 1979 in Bærum, Norway) is a Norwegian curler.

She participated in the 2006 Winter Olympics, where the Norwegian team finished in fourth place.

Teams

References

External links
 

Living people
1979 births
Sportspeople from Bærum
Norwegian female curlers
Olympic curlers of Norway
Curlers at the 2006 Winter Olympics
Norwegian curling champions
Universiade medalists in curling
Universiade bronze medalists for Norway
Medalists at the 2003 Winter Universiade